Pflueger is a surname. Notable people with the surname include:

 Donald H. Pflueger (1923–1994), American historian, educator, and author
 Timothy L. Pflueger (1892–1946), American architect and interior designer
 Sandy Pflueger (born 1954), American equestrienne

See also
Pflüger